African Well Fund is a non-profit organization dedicated to raising funds for the construction and maintenance of freshwater wells throughout impoverished sections of Africa. It was founded in October 2002 by a group of U2 fans who were inspired by frontman Bono's May 2002 visit to poor sections of Africa along with former U.S. Secretary of the Treasury Paul O'Neill. The organization was inspired by Bono's charitable work throughout Africa, but is not directly connected to the band.

The organization is partnered with Africare, and is staffed entirely by volunteers to minimize overhead.

Although most of the donations come from North Americans and Western Europeans that are not actually there to observe the people benefiting from their help, leaps towards progress occurred in African communities due to global concern and global participation, as well as cooperation and understanding amongst the people.

History 
Take one of the first well projects that cost a mere one thousand dollars. Access to water in southern Uganda in 2002 was limited due to the Great African War. It must have been a terrifying place to go out to get water for your mother, and your siblings. Children or their mothers in the village of Ntungamo had to travel long distances through the district to collect water for bathing and cooking. But, the water sources were stagnant, just holes in the ground. People often bathed in them, and children just cleaned the algae off of the surface of the water when collecting it. This spread disease in an area of the world where HIV/AIDS is often a taboo topic of discussion, and people are not always properly educated about the severity of the issue because of this.

The construction of a well with running water actually helped bring people together, and Africare water experts were able to educate people about the issue of HIV/AIDS, as well as how important it is to do their part in maintaining the well.

Celebrity involvement 
By donating money and spreading awareness about issues that people may be struggling with far away, people often feel more connected with the people they're trying to help. For Bono's 50th birthday, U2 fans attempted to raise 50,000 dollars for the Buhara District in Zimbabwe.

References

External links
The African Well Fund's website.

References 

Charities based in Africa
Development charities based in the United States
Water supply